Robert Emmet McCann (March 4, 1902 – April 15, 1937) was an American professional baseball player and manager. He was shortstop in Major League Baseball who appeared in seventy-one games for the Philadelphia Athletics in 1920–1921 and Boston Red Sox in 1926. 

Biography
Born in Philadelphia on March 4, 1902, McCann was eighteen years old when he entered the majors in 1920 with the Athletics, thus becoming the youngest player to appear in the American League that year. In parts of three seasons with Philadelphia and Boston, he was a .227 hitter (44-for-194) with eighteen RBI in seventy-one games. In fivty-seven fielding appearances, he committed sixteen errors in two hundred and fifty-one chances for a .936 percentage.

Following his playing career, McCann managed in the American Association for the Indianapolis Indians (1931–1932) and St. Paul Saints (1933), as well as for the Little Rock Travelers of the Southern Association (1934) and Elmira Pioneers of the New York–Penn League (1935).

McCann died in his hometown of Philadelphia at the age of thirty-five from suicide by gunshot.

McCann was named for the Irish martyr Robert Emmet, thus the single "t" in his middle name, by which he was called.

See also
Boston Red Sox all-time roster

References

External links
Baseball Reference
Retrosheet

1902 births
1937 suicides
Baseball players from Philadelphia
Boston Red Sox players
Columbus Senators players
Hazleton Mountaineers players
Indianapolis Indians managers
Indianapolis Indians players
Jersey City Skeeters players
Louisville Colonels (minor league) players
Major League Baseball shortstops
Philadelphia Athletics players
Portland Beavers players
St. Paul Saints (AA) managers
St. Paul Saints (AA) players
Suffolk Nuts players
Suicides by firearm in Pennsylvania
Suicides in Philadelphia